John Delahunt (born May 10, 1987) is a former professional Canadian football fullback of the Canadian Football League. He was signed as an undrafted free agent by the Hamilton Tiger-Cats on May 28, 2013. He played college football for the Connecticut Huskies.

On December 16, 2013, Delahunt was drafted by the Ottawa Redblacks in the 2013 CFL Expansion Draft.

References

External links
Ottawa Redblacks bio

1987 births
UConn Huskies football players
Hamilton Tiger-Cats players
Living people
Ottawa Redblacks players
Players of Canadian football from Ontario
Canadian football people from Ottawa